Time for Us is the second studio album by South Korean girl group GFriend. It was released by Source Music on January 14, 2019, distributed by kakao M. The album contains thirteen songs, including the lead single "Sunrise" and its instrumental version, along with a Korean version of the group's first Japanese single "Memoria".

Release and promotion 
Time for Us is GFriend's second studio album, released two years and six months after their first studio album, LOL. Time for Us was released on January 14, 2019 in three versions: "Daybreak", "Daytime" and "Midnight". Following this, a limited version of the album was then released on January 25, 2019. GFriend started their promotions with Mnet's M Countdown on January 17, 2019, where they performed "Sunrise" and "Memoria (Korean ver.)". On January 19, 2019, they performed their side track "A Starry Sky" on MBC's Show! Music Core as part of their comeback stage. During the second week of promotions, GFriend took first place on all music shows, making them the first artist in 2019 to achieve a "grand slam".

Accolades

Track listing

Personnel

Credits adapted from album liner notes.

Locations

 Recorded at VIBE Studio 
 Recorded at Seoul Studio 
 Mixed at KoKo Sound Studio 
 Mixed at Cube Studio 
 Mixed at J's Atelier Studio 
 Mixed at Mapps Studio 
 Mixed at W Sound 
 Mixed at LAFX Studios 
 Mixed at 821 Sound 
 Mastered at 821 Sound Mastering 

Personnel

 Kim Ba-ro - string arrangement 
 Kim Ye-il - bass guitar 
 Lee Won-jong - programming , piano, keyboard 
 No Joo-hwan - piano, keyboard, programming 
 Jung Dong-yoon - drum 
 Ryu Hyeon-woo - guitar 
 Kwon Nam-woo - mastering 
 Go Hyeon-jung - mixing 
 Yoong String - strings 
 Seo Yong-bae - drum programming 
 Iggy - guitar, synth 
 Young - guitar 
 Jeon Bu-yeon - mixing assistant 
 Jo-ssi Ajeossi - mixing 
 Darren Smith - keyboard, programming 
 Sean Michael Alexander - keyboard, programming 
 Jeong-jin - mixing 
 Ko Myung-jae - guitar 
 Kim Seok-min - mixing 
 B.Eyes - piano, keyboard, electric piano, bass, drum, synth 
 Minki - piano, bass 
 Kim Woong - piano, drum, bass, synth 
 Choi Young-joon - string arrangement 
 Lee Tae-wook - guitar 
 Jo Joon-sung - mixing 
 Spacecowboy - piano, keyboard, electric piano, bass, drum, synth, programming 
 Kim Dong-min - guitar 
 Son Go-eun - keyboard 
 Alan Foster - mixing 
 Kim Jin-hee - keyboard, drum 
 Master Key - mixing 
 Kim Byeong-seok - piano, bass 
 Miz - strings, string arrangement 
 Ryo Miyata - string arrangement, piano, keyboard, bass, programming 
 Carlos K. - keyboard, electric piano, bass, drum, drum programming, synth, programming 
 Toshi-Fj - guitar 
 Joe - keyboard, synth

Charts

Album

Year-end charts

Single

"Sunrise"

Year-end charts

Sales

See also

References

External links
 Album highlight medley on YouTube
 "Sunrise" on YouTube

GFriend albums
2019 albums
Korean-language albums
Kakao M albums
Hybe Corporation albums